Kyōko Nagatsuka (born February 22, 1974) is a retired Japanese tennis player. She achieved a career-high ranking of world No. 28 on 14 August 1995. In doubles, she reached as high as No. 31 in June 1995.

She won the 12-and-under championships of Japan in 1986, and the under-16 in 1989.

Nagatsuka reached three singles finals on the WTA Tour, but failed to win the title in any of them. She did, however, win two doubles titles as well as achieving a further three runner-ups in doubles competition. She reached the fourth round of a Grand Slam tournament twice in singles: at the 1995 Australian Open, where she beat a young Martina Hingis and Amy Frazier, and that same year at the French Open.

Playing for the Japan Fed Cup team, she has a win–loss record of 2–4.

Since her retirement, she has briefly worked as a coach with Akiko Morigami.

WTA career finals

Singles: 3 (3 runner-ups)

Doubles: 5 (2 titles, 3 runner-ups)

ITF Circuit finals

Singles: 2 (0–2)

Doubles: 3 (1–2)

References

External links
 
 
 

1974 births
Living people
Japanese female tennis players
Olympic tennis players of Japan
Sportspeople from Chiba Prefecture
Tennis players at the 1996 Summer Olympics
Asian Games medalists in tennis
Tennis players at the 1994 Asian Games
Medalists at the 1994 Asian Games
Asian Games gold medalists for Japan
Asian Games bronze medalists for Japan
20th-century Japanese women